Refugee is the seventh studio album by British hard rock/heavy metal band Samson, released in 1990 by Communiqué Records. It was the only album with English singer Peter Scallan, who replaced previous singer Nicky Moore. Originally released in 1990, it was reissued by Thunderbolt Records with the studio outtake "Don't Tell Me It's Over". It was also reissued in 2018 by Cherry Red Records as part of a 3-CD box set Look to the Future, Refugee & P.S..., remastered from the original production tape, and includes four bonus tracks from the 1989 Tommy Vance BBC Friday Rock Show session.

Reception

Reviews of the album were mixed. Rock Hard commented that "Look to the Future" and "The Silver Screen" are "two more or less noteworthy tracks" that are reminiscent of the band's heyday, but followed that that's about it in terms of quality. "The remaining 30 minutes are irrelevant, mostly boring run-of-the-mill numbers that seek their justification," and that "this disc doesn't have much in common with the great legend of the early '80s." Eduardo Rivadavia of AllMusic complimented Guitarist Paul Samson as being "as reliable a performer as ever," and new singer Peter Scallan with being little more than "quite decent, if hardly spectacular." Furthermore, they added that the new tracks like "Can't Live Without Your Love," "Turn on the Light," and "State of Emergency," "fit right in with Samson's blue-collar hard rock tradition." They mentioned how the re-recorded tracks from their 1988 EP And There It Is... (opener "Good to See You," the upbeat "Too Late," and the grandiose "The Silver Screen") sounded "vastly superior" here than their original versions. All of this amounts to "a rather enjoyable LP, which left many a nostalgic metal head quietly cheering for Samson's return to prominence, no matter how unlikely  and ultimately unrealistic  such a concept would prove." The Huddersfield Daily Examiners Andrew Hirst opined that Scallan's vocals were drowned out by the "screeching din" of the guitars.

Track listing

Notes
 Track 7 was also featured on the Samson compilation Burning Emotion / The Best of 1985-1990.
 Tracks 1, 10, and 12 are re-recorded tracks from 1988 EP And There It Is... 
 Tracks 13-16 recorded for the "Tommy Vance Friday Rock Show" BBC Sessions in July 1989

Personnel 
Samson
 Peter Scallan – vocals (except track 1), backing vocals
 Paul Samson – guitar, bass (except track 11), backing vocals
 Chris Aylmer – bass
 Dave Boyce – bass (track 7)
 Charlie Mack – drums (except track 11)
 Tony Tuohy – drums (track 11)
 Toby Sadler – keyboards, backing vocals

Additional musicians
 Gary Owen – vocals (track 1)
 Chris Goreham – programming (track 5)

Production
 Brian Burrows – design
 Duncan C. Storr – cover art
 Trevor Danby – executive producer
 Paul Samson – producer, engineering
 Chris Goreham – engineering assistant
 Mike Banks – engineering assistant

References

External links

1990 albums
Samson (band) albums